Mohammad Zahid (born 11 April 1966) is a Pakistani former cricketer. He played 150 first-class and 97 List A matches for several domestic teams in Pakistan between 1985 and 2005.

See also
 List of Pakistan Automobiles Corporation cricketers

References

External links
 

1966 births
Living people
Pakistani cricketers
Allied Bank Limited cricketers
Bahawalpur cricketers
Multan cricketers
Pakistan Automobiles Corporation cricketers
Cricketers from Bahawalpur